Check List is a peer-reviewed, open access, on-line scientific journal that publishes Annotated Lists of Species (ALS), Notes on Geographic Distribution (NGD), Distribution Summary (DS), Book Reviews (BR) and Forum Papers (FP). The journal was established in 2005 to serve as a mean of publishing inventories that are essential for studies on biogeography and provide a baseline for conservation studies. Since 2017 it has been published by Pensoft Publishers.

Abstracting and indexing 
Check List is abstracted and indexed in EBSCOhost, Scopus, The Zoological Record, Directory of Open Access Journals (DOAJ)  and Index Copernicus. The Journal is also member of the Brazilian Association of Science Editors (ABEC)  and the Committee on Publication Ethics (COPE).

References

External links 

 

Zoology journals
Publications established in 2005
Creative Commons-licensed journals
Bimonthly journals
English-language journals
Open access journals
Pensoft Publishers academic journals